Mustilizans hepatica is a moth in the family Endromidae. It was described by Frederic Moore in 1879. It is found in India, Thailand and Peninsular Malaysia.

Subspecies
Mustilizans hepatica hepatica (India: Darjeeling)
Mustilizans hepatica acola Zolotuhin, 2007 (Thailand)

References

Moths described in 1879
Mustilizans